The  Asian Baseball Championship was the eleventh continental tournament held by the Baseball Federation of Asia. The tournament was held in Seoul, South Korea for the third time, and was won by the hosts for their third Asian Championship; all three times when hosting the tournament.

The tournament marked the first and only time Australia secured a medal in the Asian Championships—winning bronze—despite contesting the championship through to the 1993 tournament. Through , Taiwan's 4th-place finish would be the last time they would not achieve a medal in the tournament. Japan (2nd) and Philippines (5th) were the other participants.

References

Bibliography 
 

1975
1975
Asian Baseball Championship
1975 in South Korean sport
Asian Baseball Championship
Asian Baseball Championship
1970s in Seoul
Sports competitions in Seoul